Harum Scarum is the eleventh soundtrack album by American singer and musician Elvis Presley, released by RCA Victor in mono and stereo, LPM/LSP 3468, in November 1965. It is the soundtrack to the 1965 film of the same name starring Presley. Recording sessions took place at RCA Studio B in Nashville, Tennessee, on February 24, 25, and 26, 1965. It peaked at number eight on the Top LP's chart.

Content
Although 1965 had seen the release of Elvis for Everyone, a studio album which was actually recorded over a ten-year period dating back to Presley's first recordings from Sun Studios in Memphis, and a surprising worldwide hit with a five-year-old Gospel track, "Crying In The Chapel", it was back to the grind of making soundtracks. Elvis continued to grumble about the material and the continued pressure put on the stable of songwriters corralled by Freddy Bienstock — the writing team of Giant, Baum, and Kaye alone had provided 17 of 47 songs on the past four soundtracks in an eighteen-month period — but he soldiered on with as much grace as possible. In reality, almost any song could have been squeezed into the story lines, including old classics. But as long as sales continued, the formula required guaranteed control of publishing and new songs by the same songwriters. However, Presley's sales were plummeting in music stores as well as ticket sales at the box office.

Eleven songs were recorded for Harum Scarum, and all were used and issued on the soundtrack with two of the tracks omitted in the film. As with Roustabout, no singles were issued in conjunction with the album. A single was issued a month later, using the leftover 1957 track "Tell Me Why" backed with "Blue River" from the aborted May 1963 "album" sessions. In an ominous sign of things to come, it only made it to number 33 on the Billboard Hot 100, the lowest charting single of Presley's career to date.

Elvis recorded "Wisdom of the Ages" on February 24, 1965 at RCA studios. It featured as a bonus track on the soundtrack album, along with "Animal Instinct", but did not feature in the film itself. The Jordanaires sang backing vocals. The song progresses from F major to B flat major, to D minor to E flat major to F major.

The film and its soundtrack are widely considered one of the lowest points of Presley's career.

Reissues
In 2003 Harum Scarum was reissued on the Follow That Dream label in a special edition that contained the original album tracks along with numerous alternate takes.

Track listing

Original release

2003 Follow That Dream reissue

Personnel
 Elvis Presley - vocals
 The Jordanaires - backing vocals
 Rufus Long - flute
 Ralph Strobel - oboe
 Scotty Moore - electric guitar
 Grady Martin - electric guitar
Charlie McCoy - electric guitar
 Floyd Cramer - piano
 Henry Strzelecki - electric bass
 D. J. Fontana - drums
Kenny Buttrey - drums
 Hoyt Hawkins - tambourine
 Gene Nelson - congas

Charts
Album

References

External links

LPM-3468 Harum Scarum Guide part of The Elvis Presley Record Research Database
Recording session information

1965 soundtrack albums
Elvis Presley soundtracks
RCA Victor soundtracks
Albums produced by Fred Karger
Albums produced by Gene Nelson
Musical film soundtracks
Comedy film soundtracks